One Armed Swordsman Against Nine Killers ( Aka: One Armed Against nine killers.) is a 1976 Chinese film starring Jimmy Wang Yu. Although the film stars Jimmy Wang Yu as the one-armed swordsman, it has no connection to the 1967 film One-Armed Swordsman and its sequel the 1969 film Return of the One-Armed Swordsman.

Plot
Set In Ancient China, A one-armed swordsman warrior battles a gang of killers. nine killers ready to defeat them as a great Handicaped One Armed Sword And Fighting Man.

Cast
 Jimmy Wang Yu 	as Liu Ching Wu / Liu Yi Su
 Lo Lieh   	as Shao Si Yu
 Chung Wah   	as Mung Sing Hung, one of the Nine Killers
 Ng Ho     	as Lo Hsiang Pu, one of the Nine Killers
 Lung Fei   	as Yen Hsi Su, one of the Nine Killers
 Chin Lung 	as Tai Li Wa, one of the Nine Killers
 Wong Chi-Sang 	as Fu Pai Su, one of the Nine Killers
 Wan Shan  	as Chu Lu, one of the Nine Killers
 Chen Hung-Lieh 	as Liu Yan, one of the Nine Killers
 Choi Sung         as Tang Han, one of the Nine Killers
 Wong Wing-Sang 	as Mo Fei To, one of the Nine Killers
 Cho Kin   	as Chow Yi To / Chu Chiu-Tzu
 Ko Chun-Pang 	as Fortune teller
 Hsieh Hsing 	as Assassin
 Hau Pak-Wai 	as Wong Pa, the "Turtle"
 Sit Hon   	as Liu's servant
 Yu Heng   	as Dr. Poison
 Wong Gwok-Chue 	as Monk Hsiao Hua
 Miu Tak-San 	as Brothel host
 Woo Hon-Cheung 	as Rat
 Bao Zheng-Fang 	as Su Lang Lang
 Pui Tak-Wan 	as Assassin
 Tang Keung-Mei 	as Lu Hsiang-Cho "Twin"
 Tang Keung-Ying 	as Lu Hsiang-Chu "Twin"

References

External links

One Armed Swordsman Versus Nine Killers at Rotten Tomatoes

1976 films
Hong Kong martial arts films
Hong Kong sequel films
1970s Mandarin-language films
1970s Hong Kong films